Qashqai (قشقایی ديلى, Qašqāyī dili; also spelled Qaşqay, Qashqayi, Kashkai, Kashkay, Qašqāʾī and Qashqa'i or Kaşkay) is an Oghuz Turkic language spoken by the Qashqai people, an ethnic group living mainly in the Fars Province of Southern Iran. Encyclopædia Iranica regards Qashqai as an independent third group of dialects within the Southwestern Turkic language group. It is known to speakers as Turki. Estimates of the number of Qashqai speakers vary.

The Qashqai language is closely related to Azerbaijani. However, some Qashqai varieties namely the variety spoken in the Sheshbeyli tribe share features with Turkish. In a sociopolitical sense, though, Qashqai is considered a language in its own right.

Like other Turkic languages spoken in Iran, such as the Azerbaijani language, Qashqai uses a modified version of the Perso-Arabic script.

Phonology

Consonants 

 Sounds // and // only occur as loan consonants from Persian and Arabic.
 Sounds /, / mainly occur phonemically before consonants, but may occur as aspirated before vowels or in word-final position as [].
 Sounds /, / never occur in word-initial position, except in a few loan words.
 [] only occurs as an intervocalic allophone of // when occurring between two rounded vowels. It may also occur in vowel diphthongs as [].
 // and // can occur phonemically as [] and [] when preceding front vowels.
 // may occur as two allophones; as [] before front vowels, or as [] before back vowels.
 // can have two allophones; as [] in word-initial and word-medial positions, or as [] in word-final positions. In native words, // rarely occurs word-initially.

Vowels 

 Vowels // and // are used rather infrequently.
 // only occurs as a word-final variant of //.
// is always realized in word-final position as [].
 // can be realized as [] in non-initial positions.
 // mainly occurs as a centralized allophone [] when preceding palatal consonants.
 Vowel // is in free variation with its rounded equivalent //, when occurring in front syllables.

Morphology 

The suffixes are similar to Azerbaijani.

Syntax 
Qashqai follows common Turkic syntax features: dependent marking, head-final within unmarked phrases, free word order with SOV preferred, agglutinative.

References

Further reading 
 Csató Éva Ágnes, 2001. Present in Kashkay. In: Turkic Languages, Vol. 5: 104-119.
 Csató Éva Ágnes, 2005. On copying in Kashkay. In: Éva Á. Csató, Bo Isakssons & Carina Jahani (eds.) Linguistic Conversion and areal diffusion: Case studies from Iranian, Semitic and Turkic, London, Routledge Curzon, 271-283.
 Csató Éva Ágnes. 2006. Gunnar Jaring's Kashkay materials, In Lars Johanson & Christiane Bulut (eds.), Turkic-Iranian contact areas. Historical and linguistic aspect. Wiesbaden: Harrassowitz Verlag. 209-225.
 Doerfer Gerhard, et al. 1990. Qašqā’ī-Gedichte aus Fīrūz-ābād (=Südoghusisch). In: Oghusica aus Iran, Wiesbaden: Otto Harrassowitz, pp. 67–132.
 Dolatkhah Sohrab, Csató Éva Á. & Karakoç Birsel. 2016. On the marker -(y)akï in Kashkay. In: Éva Á. Csató, Lars Johanson, András Róna-Tas, and Bo Utas (eds.) Turks and Iranians: Interactions in Language and History, pp. 283–301. Wiesbaden: Harrassowitz Verlag.
 Dolatkhah Sohrab. 2016. Parlons qashqay "Let's speak Qashqay". Paris: L'Harmattan.
 Dolatkhah Sohrab. 2016. Kashkai : langue turcique d'Iran. (Réédition du titre Qashqay : langue turcique d'Iran). Independently published (via Amazon).
 Dolatkhah Sohrab. 2015. Qashqay Folktales: transcription, translation, glossary. CreateSpace Independent publishing platform.
 Dolatkhah Sohrab. 2012. Elements for a grammar of Kashkay: a Turkic language of Iran. PhD dissertation. Paris: Ecole Pratique des Hautes Etudes.
 Dolatkhah Sohrab. 2007. Présentation et documentation du folklore qashqai : langue turcique du sud d’Iran. Master thesis. Paris: Ecole Pratique des Hautes Etudes.
 Gharakhalou-Narrei, Mehdi. 1996. Migration and cultural change in urban communities of the Qashqa'i of Iran. PhD thesis. Ottawa: University of Ottawa.
 Jurie Étienne. 2005. Qashqa’i : derniers nomades d’Iran. Paris : Voyages Zellidja.
 Mardâni R. Assadollâh, 2000. Asanaklar : Tarânehâye torkiye qašqâ’ī "Qashqai folksongs" [in Perso-Arabic script]. Iran: Nakhlhâ-ye Sorkh Publishers.
 Mardâni R. Assadollâh, 2007. Qašqayı sözlügü [Qashqai Dictionary]. [in Azerbaijani and Perso-Arabic script with explications in Persian] Shiraz: Rahgosha Publishers.
 Menges, Karl Heinrich, 1990. Drei Qašqā’ī Text. In: Doerfer et al. (eds.), pp. 135–138.
 Shahbâzi, Habib. (ed.). 1989/1368 A.H., Qašqâ’ï še’ri [Qashqai poetry] [in Perso-Arabic script], Shiraz: Shahbazi.
 Soper, John David, 1987. Loan Syntax in Turkic and Iranian: The Verb Systems of Tajik, Uzbek, and Qashqai. Doctoral dissertation, Los Angeles: University of California

External links 
 The Last Nomads of Iran (BBC)

Agglutinative languages
Languages of Iran
Oghuz languages
Turkic languages